The Vermelho River, also known as the Poguba River, is a river in the state of Mato Grosso, Brazil. In its lower reaches it is called the São Lourenço River.

The Vermelho River runs through the south of the city of Rondonópolis, Mato Grosso, and past the Dom Osório Stoffel State Park on its south (left) bank.
It continues in a generally southwest direction to become the São Lourenço around the municipality of Barão de Melgaço.

See also
List of rivers of Mato Grosso

References

Rivers of Mato Grosso